is a railway station in the city of Suzaka, Nagano, Japan, operated by the private railway operating company Nagano Electric Railway.

Lines
Suzaka Station is a station on the Nagano Electric Railway Nagano Line and is 12.5 kilometers from the terminus of the line at Nagano Station.

Station layout
The station consists of one ground-level side platform and two island platforms serving five tracks, with an elevated station building.

Platforms

Adjacent stations

History
The station opened on 10 June 1922. From 1922 to 2012, it was also a station on the now-discontinued Kato Line.

Passenger statistics
In fiscal 2016, the station was used by an average of 3052 passengers daily (boarding passengers only).

Surrounding area

Suzaka City Hall
Suzaka Post Office
Suzaka High School

See also
 List of railway stations in Japan

References

External links

 

Railway stations in Japan opened in 1922
Railway stations in Nagano Prefecture
Nagano Electric Railway
Suzaka, Nagano